Thalla is a village near Nagar, Tehsil Phillaur, Jalandhar district, in Punjab, India.

Demographics
According to 2011 Census, Thalla has a population of 2,251 people. The village has . Neighbouring villages include Bansia Dhak, Bhar Singh Pur, Khanpur, Pall Kadim, Rasulpur,  Nagar, Katpalon, Ashahoor and Kadiana.

History
It is said that the village is named after Maha Singh of Thal desert who lived during Maharaja Ranjit Singh's rule, thus making the village at least 200 years old. Maha Singh's descendants live in the village and are known as Jagirdars.
The village is famous for the Shaheed Mohinder Singh Tiger BSF Annual Memorial Tournament which takes place in December.

References

Jalandhar
Villages in Jalandhar district
Villages in Phillaur tehsil